Vitaly Mikhaylovich Zholobov (born 18 June 1937) is a retired Soviet cosmonaut who flew on Soyuz 21 space flight as the flight engineer.

Career
Zholobov joined the space programme from the Soviet Air Force where he held the rank of Colonel-engineer.

His only trip to space involved a two-month stay on the Salyut 5 space station (Soyuz 21 mission). The flight was scheduled to last for 60 days but lasted for only 49. The reason for the cancellation was the detection of a noxious odor on board. Vitaly Zholobov reported to the Mission Control Center that the smell was similar to that of a propellant which was known to be toxic. The Control Center decided to abort the mission to avoid exposing the crew to further risk and because the research and technology programs were already successfully finished. He was in orbit from 6 June 1976 to 24 August 1976.

Although he never flew again, Zholobov stayed in the space programme until 1981 when he resigned to become director of a geological science research group.

Awards
Hero of the Soviet Union
Pilot-Cosmonaut of the USSR
Order of Merit 3rd class (Ukraine)
Order of Lenin
Medal "For Merit in Space Exploration" (Russian Federation)
Medal "For the Development of Virgin Lands"
Medal "For Distinction in Guarding the State Border of the USSR"

References

External links 

 The story of Space Station Mir, David Michael Harland, 2005, page 16
The official website of the city administration Baikonur - Honorary citizens of Baikonur

1937 births
Living people
People from Kherson Oblast
Soviet cosmonauts
Heroes of the Soviet Union
Ukrainian politicians
Governors of Kherson Oblast
Recipients of the Order of Merit (Ukraine), 3rd class
Recipients of the Order of Lenin
Recipients of the Medal "For Merit in Space Exploration"
Recipients of the Medal "For Distinction in Guarding the State Border of the USSR"
Salyut program cosmonauts